Giovanni Franzoni (born 30 March 2001) is an Italian World Cup alpine ski racer

World Championship results

References

External links
 

2001 births
Living people
Italian male alpine skiers
Alpine skiers of Fiamme Gialle